Typefaces which contain pictures or symbols rather than letters and numbers are called non-alphanumeric typefaces. Important subclasses are dingbats, ornamental and pictorial typefaces

References

External links 
Remove / Delete Non-Alphanumeric Characters (Commas, Dots, Special Symbols, Math Symbols etc.) from text.

Typefaces